"Stars Align" is a song by Dutch-Moroccan DJ R3hab and Taiwanese singer Jolin Tsai. The song was produced by R3hab, who wrote it alongside Rik Annema and Cimo Fränkel. It was released for digital download and streaming by Liquid State on March 21, 2021 as a single. It was the third anniversary theme song of the mobile game, PUBG Mobile.

Background and release 
On August 30, 2020, Tsai's manager Tom Wang said that Tsai has plan to release new musical work. On November 29, 2020, Tsai said that she would release a new single in the next year. On December 22, 2020, Tsai said: "The new song really depends on the luck, I will start to do some production, but whether I can finish it in time, I am also full of question marks." On January 19, 2021, Tsai's manager Tom Wang said that Tsai had finished the new single, and Tsai said: "It took a long time to choose the new song."

On March 18, 2021, R3hab announced that his new single which collaborated with Tsai would be released on March 21, 2021, Tsai said: "Words can't describe this song, so I'm looking forward to seeing it and seeing how fans react to it!" On March 22, 2021, Tsai said that they would plan to shoot the music video of the song. On April 22, 2021, the remix version by Alle Farben was released. On May 20, 2021 the remix version by Faulhaber was released.

Writing and production 
"Stars Align" is an electronic dance music featured R3hab's signature electronic rhythm, which made the song dynamic and layered, while Tsai's distinctive enunciation and vocals perfectly blended into the dance music style.

It was the first collaboration between R3hab and Tsai, who said, "As soon as I received the demo, I liked it and listened to it very much, especially the hook of the song was very attractive and interesting. After I heard the finished version, the song's melody and rhythm, I really wanted to dance!" R3hab said that he has been always pushing the boundaries and exploring different genres, and the collaboration with Tsai has stimulated his music creation and imagination.

Music video 
On April 5, 2021, American independent EDM promoter Proximity released the lyric video of "Stars Align". On April 23, 2021, Tsai released the official music video, which was directed by Taiwanese director Muh Chen. It begins with Tsai woke up in a fantasy forest, at the moment she met a hermit, she followed the hermit to came to a mysterious Moroccan style building, here she experienced insomnia, cry, not eat or drink, dust-laden herself, and other symptoms, after experienced the love the "illness", her heart gradually restored. It took two days to shoot, and Tsai changed eight outfits in the video.

In order to present the exotic atmosphere, it was filmed in the Amanda Hotel Kenting in Hengchun, Taiwan. Tsai Said: "I went to Morocco the year before last, and I felt as if I was reviewing my North Africa tour when I came in! The windows of the Moroccan building face the atrium, and the rooms are brightly colored, and there is also a swimming pool with special arcs and gorgeous colors. Walking here makes you feel rich!" It was also filmed in the Gangkou White Banyan Garden in Manzhou, Taiwan. "I am very grateful to have the opportunity to visit such a precious place because of this shoot," said Tsai. The dance moves in the video are a combination of vogue and floorwork, which are extremely difficult. On December 1, 2021, it was ranked fourth on the most-viewed music videos of YouTube Taiwan of 2021.

Awards 
On December 12, 2021, "Stars Align" won a Tencent Music Entertainment Award for Top 10 Songs.

Track listings 
Digital download and streaming
 "Stars Align" – 2:41

Digital download and streaming – "Stars Align" (Alle Farben remix)
 "Stars Align" (Alle Farben remix) – 2:54

Digital download and streaming – "Stars Align" (Faulhaber remix)
 "Stars Align" (Faulhaber remix) – 2:44

Release history

References 

2021 singles
2021 songs
Jolin Tsai songs
R3hab songs
Video game theme songs